"How Ya Like Me Now" is a song by American rapper Kool Moe Dee. It was released in 1987 as the first single from his second studio album of the same name.

Produced and written in collaboration with Teddy Riley, the song is a diss-track to rival rapper LL Cool J.

The song became Kool Moe Dee's first to appear on the Billboard Hot R&B/Hip-Hop Songs, peaked at No. 22 in January 1988 and stayed on the chart for 18 weeks. Also peaked No. 86 on the UK Singles Chart.

"How Ya Like Me Now" was  31 on VH1's 100 Greatest Songs of Hip Hop list.

Charts

See also
List of notable diss tracks

References

1987 songs
1988 singles
Kool Moe Dee songs
Song recordings produced by Teddy Riley
Songs written by Teddy Riley